Jason Maxwell Brooks (born May 10, 1966) is an American actor. He is best known for playing Peter Blake on the soap opera Days of Our Lives and Sean Monroe on Baywatch Hawaii.

Career 
Brooks started his career as an actor in 1990 when he was 24 years old. He had recurring appearances on the television shows The Pretender and The Suite Life of Zack & Cody. He played Bacarra, a warlock. in an episode of Charmed. He also appeared in an episode of the NBC sitcom Friends as Rick in "The One with the Ballroom Dancing" in season four.

Brooks voiced the protagonist, Ronan O'Connor, of the 2014 action-adventure video game, Murdered: Soul Suspect.

Personal life
He married Corinne Olivo on February 20, 1994. They have two sons. He is the son in law of actress Danica d'Hondt and brother-in-law of America Olivo, Neve Campbell, and Christian Campbell.

Filmography

Film

Television

References

External links

1966 births
American male film actors
American male soap opera actors
American male television actors
Living people
Male actors from Colorado Springs, Colorado
Male actors from Los Angeles
American people of Canadian descent
American people of French descent
20th-century American male actors
21st-century American male actors